Cameron Hugh McArthur is a judge currently serving on the Tax Court of Canada. He took office on April 2, 1993.

References

Judges of the Federal Court of Canada
Year of birth missing (living people)
Living people
Place of birth missing (living people)
20th-century Canadian judges